Welbury railway station was a railway station serving the village of Welbury in North Yorkshire, England. Located on the Northallerton to Eaglescliffe Line (now part of the North TransPennine route) it was opened on 2 June 1852 by the Leeds Northern Railway. It closed to passengers on 20 September 1954 and closed completely in 1963.

Freight is mostly, steel, coal and biomass run by several operators.

There is a level crossing at Welbury which is controlled by Low Gates box in Northallerton.

References

Disused railway stations in North Yorkshire
Railway stations in Great Britain opened in 1852
Railway stations in Great Britain closed in 1954
Former North Eastern Railway (UK) stations
1852 establishments in England